Dorte Rasmussen may refer to:

Dorte Lohse (born 1971), Danish cyclist
Dorthe Rasmussen (born 1960), Danish distance runner